Hemonia is a genus of moths in the family Erebidae first described by Francis Walker in 1863. They are found only in Sri Lanka and Borneo.

Description
Palpi slight and porrect (extending forward). Antennae ciliated in male. Forewings very broad and rounded. Vein 3 from before angle of cell, veins 4, 5 and 6, 7 stalked. Veins 8 to 11 nearly erect where vein 11 anastomosing (fusing) with vein 12. Hindwing with veins 4 and 5 stalked, vein 3 absent, vein 6 and 7 stalked and vein 8 from near end of cell.

Species
 Hemonia micrommata Turner, 1899
 Hemonia monochroa Hampson, 1914
 Hemonia murina Rothschild, 1913
 Hemonia orbiferana Walker, 1863
 Hemonia pallida Hampson, 1914
 Hemonia rotundata Snellen, 1879
 Hemonia schistacea Rothschild, 1913
 Hemonia schistaceoalba Rothschild, 1913
 Hemonia simillima Rothschild, 1913

References

External links

Nudariina
Moth genera